Mark Kurt Nawaane (21 April 1966) is a Ghanaian politician and member of the Seventh Parliament of the Fourth Republic of Ghana representing the Nabdam Constituency in the Upper East Region on the ticket of the National Democratic Congress.

Early life and education 
Nawaane hails from Kongo-Nangodi. He holds an M.B.A from Paris Graduate School of Management and an M.D. from the Institute of Medicine and Hygiene, St.Petersburg, Russia.

References

Ghanaian MPs 2017–2021
1966 births
Living people
National Democratic Congress (Ghana) politicians
Ghanaian MPs 2021–2025